Landecker Berg is a mountain of Hesse, Germany.

Hills of Hesse
Mountains and hills of the Rhön